Mont de Grange (2,432 m) is a mountain of the Chablais Alps in Haute-Savoie, France.

References

Mountains of Haute-Savoie
Mountains of the Alps